Robert Meeropol (born May 14, 1947 as Robert Rosenberg) is the younger son of Ethel and Julius Rosenberg. Meeropol was born in New York City. His father Julius was an electrical engineer and a member of the Communist Party. His mother Ethel (née Greenglass), a union organizer, was also active in the Communist Party. 

In 1953, when Robert was six years old, his parents were convicted and executed for conspiracy to commit espionage, and specifically for passing secrets of the atomic bomb to the Soviet Union.

Early life and education
After the Rosenbergs were arrested, Robert and his older brother Michael lived with their maternal grandmother, Tessie Greenglass.  After three months, she was unable to continue such care and placed them in the Hebrew Children's Home. After several months, their paternal grandmother Sophie Rosenberg removed them from the children's home to care for the boys herself.  During their stay with her, the boys were allowed to visit their parents in Sing Sing prison. After one year with Sophie, the boys were sent to Toms River, New Jersey to live with the Bach family, friends of the Rosenbergs. They were eventually adopted by the writer and songwriter Abel Meeropol and his wife Anne and took their last name.

Meeropol earned his bachelor's and master's degrees in anthropology at Earlham College and the University of Michigan.

Activism and career

In the 1960s and 1970s, Meeropol became active in the anti-war effort. After completing his master's degree, Meeropol taught anthropology at Western New England College in Springfield, Massachusetts from 1971 to 1973.

With his brother, Meeropol sued the FBI and CIA under the Freedom of Information Act (FOIA), winning the release of 300,000 previously secret documents pertaining to their parents' case. Believing the documents proved their parents' innocence, the Meeropol brothers co-wrote a 1975 book about their childhood. From 1974 to 1978, he worked actively with the National Committee to reopen the Rosenberg Case and the Fund for Open Information and Accountability.

From 1980 to 1982 he was managing editor of Socialist Review in the San Francisco Bay Area. During this time, his parents' executioner, Joseph Francel, died. In 1982 Meeropol moved back to Massachusetts. He returned to school, studying at the Western New England College School of Law, from which he received his J.D. degree in 1985. He was admitted to the Massachusetts Bar and began practice as an attorney.

In 1990, Meeropol started the Rosenberg Fund for Children, a public foundation which provides support for children in the U.S. whose parents are targeted, progressive activists. The RFC also supports youth in the U.S. who have been targeted for their own progressive activism. He stepped down from the position of Executive Director of RFC on September 1, 2013, to be succeeded by his daughter Jennifer.

In 2003 he wrote a memoir that reflected on his life and his parents' fate.

Marriage and family
Robert is married to Ellen Meeropol. They have two daughters: Jennifer and Rachel. Rachel has become a lawyer for the Center for Constitutional Rights in New York City.

Current position on parents' executions
In 2008, Michael Meeropol and Robert Meeropol said that, given recent revelations by their parents' co-defendant Morton Sobell and Venona project documents released in 1995, they now believed that their father was involved in espionage for the Soviet Union. However, they also said"To this day, there is no credible evidence that he participated in obtaining or passing on ... the secret of the atomic bomb, the crime for which he was executed."They also believed documents showed that witnesses had fabricated evidence against their mother, and that she was innocent of the government charges.

References

External link
 

1947 births
American adoptees
American socialists
Jewish American writers
Activists from New York City
People from Toms River, New Jersey
Living people
Julius and Ethel Rosenberg
University of Michigan College of Literature, Science, and the Arts alumni
Western New England University faculty